Risi may refer to:

People
Bruno Risi (b. 1968), Swiss professional racing cyclist
Dino Risi (1916–2008), Italian film director 
Giuliano De Risi (b. 1945), Italian journalist
Lucio de Risi (b. 1953), Italian electrical engineer
Nelo Risi (1920–2015), Italian poet and film director
Peter Risi (1950–2010), Swiss footballer
Umberto Risi (b. 1940), Italian steeplechase runner
Vittoria Risi (b. 1978), Italian pornographic actress

Places
Risi, Iran, a village in Razavi Khorasan Province, Iran

Other uses
Risi Competizione, American auto racing team formed by Giuseppe Risi
Risi, in Old Norse, means "giant" and usually refers to a race of legendary beings called the Jötnar.
RISI, Repository of Industrial Security Incidents
RISI, Russian Institute for Strategic Research or Russian Institute for Strategic Studies